Palmares is a canton in the Alajuela province of Costa Rica.

History 
Palmares was created on 30 July 1888 by decree 68.

The first settlers in what today is Palmares are believed to have arrived in 1835 from the cities of Alajuela and Belén, looking for land where to cultivate tobacco and other products.

Geography 
Palmares has an area of  km2 and a mean elevation of  metres.

The canton encompasses a circular area with the city of Palmares at its center. The Aguacate Mountains establish the boundary on the canton's southwestern edge and the Grande River delineates the boundary on its north and northeast sides.

Districts 

The canton of Palmares is subdivided into the following districts:
 Palmares
 Zaragoza
 Buenos Aires
 Santiago
 Candelaria
 Esquipulas
 La Granja

Demographics 

For the 2011 census, Palmares had a population of  inhabitants.

Transportation

Road transportation 
The canton is covered by the following road routes:

References 

Cantons of Alajuela Province
Populated places in Alajuela Province